Marcel Thull (born 24 March 1951) is a Luxembourgian former cyclist. He competed in the individual road race event at the 1976 Summer Olympics.

References

External links
 

1951 births
Living people
Luxembourgian male cyclists
Olympic cyclists of Luxembourg
Cyclists at the 1976 Summer Olympics
People from Kayl